Suresh Malla is a Nepalese politician. He was elected to the Pratinidhi Sabha in the 1999 election on behalf of the Nepali Congress.

References

Living people
Nepali Congress politicians
Year of birth missing (living people)
Nepal MPs 1999–2002